A gyroball is a type of baseball pitch used primarily by players in Japan. It is thrown with a spiral-like spin, so that there is no Magnus force on the ball as it arrives at home plate. The gyroball is sometimes confused with the shuuto, another pitch used in Japan.

Overview
The gyroball pitch was first identified by the Japanese scientist Ryutaro Himeno (姫野 龍太郎), and later developed into a specific throwing technique by baseball instructor Kazushi Tezuka (手塚 一志), who used computer simulations to create a new style of delivery intended to reduce stress on the pitcher. They published their work in a book, currently available only in Japan, the title of which is roughly translated as The Secret of the Miracle Pitch (魔球の正体).

However, the technique to throwing the gyroball is all in the arms, not in the unique grip of the baseball. Kazushi Tezuka is an instructor at the Jyoutatsuya baseball dojo in Tokyo, and Osaka, Japan. According to Tezuka, use of the arms "is the most important part of throwing the gyroball. It has nothing to do with the hands."

Himeno and Tezuka have said, a gyroball is thrown so that at the point of release, instead of having the pitcher's elbow move inwards, towards the body (the standard method used in the United States), the pitcher rotates his elbow so that it moves away from his body, toward third base for a right-handed pitcher and toward first base for a left-handed pitcher. This is also known as pronation.

The unusual method of delivery creates a bullet-like spin on the ball with the axis of spin in line with the direction of the throw, similar to the way an American football is thrown. Tezuka has stated, if the pitch is thrown correctly, it will fly straight like a fastball. Contrary to early speculation that the gyroball was a late moving breaking ball, the fact that the pitch travels with a bullet-spin denotes that the baseball is stabilized, hence the lack of movement. In baseball, most pitches are thrown with back-spin, like the usual fastball, or with a top-spin, like the curveball and the slider.

When throwing a gyroball, a pitcher holds the side of the ball with a fastball grip placed on the baseball's center (or equator). The pitcher's hips and throwing shoulder must be in near-perfect sync, something the book refers to as "double-spin mechanics." According to Tezuka,  the arm angle needs to be low, no higher than a sidearm delivery. As the pitcher rotates his shoulder, he snaps his wrist and pulls down his fingers rather than flipping them over the ball, as happens with curveballs. For the correct spin axis, the equatorial plane must first be determined by the proper finger pressure during release.  The ball rolls off the index and middle fingers to the thumb side of the hand as the pitch is released. If gripped in the right manner, the rotation will have a true side-spin; if the ball is held above or below its equator, the rotation would be unstable. When the pitcher lets go, he must pronate his wrist, or turn it so the palm faces third base.  

Incidentally, the flight of some Knuckleball pitches, such as those thrown by R. A. Dickey, also have a forward pointing rotational axis similar to a gyroball. The difference is, the knuckleball spins significantly more slowly and has less velocity, which greatly subjects the baseball to the effects of drag as well as gravity, and translates into an erratic flight-path. However, this shows that a bullet-like spiral is consistently achievable despite differing methods of pitch delivery. A gyroball's stability is dependent upon its rotation speed and the amount of forward motion, resulting in a straight trajectory with less drop.

Batters use the arm speed of the pitcher and the spin on a baseball, made visible by the seams, to judge the speed and trajectory of a pitch. The gyroball is thrown with the arm speed of a usual fastball, but with a different actual speed. Its bullet-like spinning motion may hide the seams of a ball from the view of the batter, making it difficult to predict the pitch. Typical strategy entails throwing many variations of pitches, followed by a gyroball. The batter, predicting a change in speed caused by the ball's spin, may adapt to the wrong speed and swing incorrectly.

The gyroball is also often confused with a completely different Japanese pitch called the shuuto, due to an error in a well-known article by baseball writer Will Carroll. Although Carroll later corrected himself, the confusion still persists.

Appearance in popular culture

Video games
In March 2005, Baseball Mogul was the first game to include the "Gyroball". The pitch was included in the arsenal of Daisuke Matsuzaka. However, because Matsuzaka was not yet with the Red Sox, players had to simulate into the 2006 season before the gyroball became available. Additionally, the gyroball is available in Baseball Mogul's player editor, and can be learned in Spring Training by pitchers that enter the game after 2005. In the game's graphical play-by-play mode, the pitch comes out of the pitcher's hand as a fastball, but fails to rise like a traditional four-seam fastball.

In the video game MLB 07: The Show and the more recent The Bigs, only Daisuke Matsuzaka has the ability to throw the gyroball, although the movement of the pitch in the video game differs from the movement of the actual pitch. Daisuke Matsuzaka has himself stated, "looks like they are talking about my cut fastball or sinking slider. I guess sometimes it has a similar rotation of a gyro, when I fail to throw the cut fastball or the slider properly, but it is not exactly a gyro itself. It is different. There is a particular way of throwing it. I guess it is a kind of shuuto-like cut fastball". (However, in the long-lasting Japan-Baseball game series Jikkyō Powerful Pro Yakyū series, Daisuke is never given "Gyroball" ability for any installment, nor in the MLB Power Pros series installment.) It is an obtainable ability in the MLB Power Pros series, and its effect is to make the fastball look faster.

Japanese animation
In the Japanese manga and anime baseball series Major, the protagonist, Goro, is known for his use of the gyroball pitch, which was his only pitch until he eventually adds a forkball to his repertoire.

Gyroballers

Official gyroballers
Tetsuro Kawajiri (retired): He is supposedly a typical gyroballer in Japan. According to the book, the authors confirmed he threw a two-seam gyroball. It confuses the batter by giving the illusion that the ball is faster than it actually is, because of the greater difference between the start speed and end speed. The batter cannot adapt to the slower end speed, which is not what he expected.
The gyroball is often confused with a changeup, but the beginning speed is the same as a fastball.
Shunsuke Watanabe (Chiba Lotte Marines): He and Tezuka officially allowed him to be a gyroballer, he throws a two-seam gyroball. He thought it was just a non-breaking curveball before Tezuka told him it was the gyroball. He throws four-seam gyro as well.
Tomoki Hoshino (Seibu Lions)
Nobuyuki Hoshino (retired): According to Tezuka, their fastball has a four-seam spiral movement. This is the four-seam gyroball. The nature is opposite to two-seam, the batter may confuse it as being much slower initially. Tezuka pointed it out in "スポーツトレーニングが変わる本" which means The book which changed a way of sports training. Especially Nobuyuki, he was supposed to be a typical slow baller, nevertheless, Norihiro Nakamura thinks his fastball was the fastest in Japan, much better than even Matsuzaka's. Since they both are left-handed, the moving direction is opposite to the other pitchers.

Possibilities
Daisuke Matsuzaka: Familiar with the gyroball, Matsuzaka has stated that he can throw the gyroball, however cannot do so on a consistent basis. A careful computer analysis of Matsuzaka's pitches for the Boston Red Sox for the first half of the 2007 season by Dan Fox of Baseball Prospectus suggests that while Matsuzaka commands a dazzling array of pitches, the gyroball is more myth than reality. However, Daisuke has said he is trying to learn to throw the trick pitch.
C. J. Wilson: He has claimed that he throws the gyroball. However, just as his two-seam ball, it is sometimes very similar to a slider or sinker in spite of his adoption of Tezuka's theory; he cannot control it. He guesses because the gyro axle is inclined in irregularity. But while trying to learn the gyro, Wilson developed a new hybrid pitch, which he calls the Cork. The Cork, described by Wilson, is a "rising cut fastball." He uses this as his out pitch against left-handed hitters. In the ALCS 2010 Game 1 press conference on October 14, 2010, he said he doesn't believe it's very good for the arm, so he doesn't throw it very much. His two surgeries took place after he began throwing it. However, he does throw it if he feels confident and is having a successful outing.
Hideo Nomo: Tezuka thinks that his fastball is probably a gyroball.
Jered Weaver: His fastball is considered the four-seam gyro.
Pedro Martínez: Tezuka thinks he throws it accidentally.
Roger Clemens: Kazuo Matsui reckons he may throw it because his fastball has a gyroball-like rotation.
Steve Palazzolo: Former CanAm and Minor League pitcher is attempting to learn the pitch from Will Carroll, a columnist for Baseball Prospectus. *Note: Let it be known that Will Carroll has admitted to the fact that the pitch that he had taught to Joey Niezer and Craig Stutler, and wrote an article about in the Baseball Prospectus, was not in fact the gyro (or at least, the same gyroball which is taught by Tezuka and Himeno)
Kids: For example, Akinori Otsuka said his nine-year-old son throws a gyroball-like ball even though Otsuka himself cannot throw it. Tezuka thinks many children throw it unconsciously before their instructors modify their natural pitching form.

References

External links
 ESPN article including video of hitters facing the Gyroball
 Video Matsuzaka's Gyroball Revealed
 A demonstration by Tezuka, posted on New York Times
 The Japanese Gyroball Mystery New York Times article by Lee Jenkins.
 Recent Yahoo! Sports article on the true Gyroball Another Yahoo! Sports article by Jeff Passan.
 Video, possibly of Gyroballs
 "Explainer" on the gyroball. from Slate.
 Searching for Baseball's Bigfoot , a Yahoo! Sports article by Jeff Passan.
 Yahoo! Sports article
 Unwinding the Gyroball by Brett Bull, special to SI.com.
 Big Empire article
 A slowed-down video showing the movement and spin of the gyroball
 Video Trajectory of the Gyroball

Baseball pitches
Baseball in Japan